Konrad Hischier (13 August 1935 – 19 December 2012) was a Swiss cross-country skier. He competed at the 1960 Winter Olympics, the 1964 Winter Olympics and the 1968 Winter Olympics.

References

External links
 

1935 births
2012 deaths
Swiss male cross-country skiers
Olympic cross-country skiers of Switzerland
Cross-country skiers at the 1960 Winter Olympics
Cross-country skiers at the 1964 Winter Olympics
Cross-country skiers at the 1968 Winter Olympics
Sportspeople from Valais
20th-century Swiss people